State Route 68 (SR 68) is a  state highway in the northeastern part of the U.S. state of Alabama. The western terminus of the highway is at an intersection with SR 75 slightly northeast of Albertville. The highway continues until it reaches the Georgia state line becoming Georgia State Route 114 (SR 114).

Route description
SR 68 begins at the foothills of the Appalachian Mountains northeast of Albertville. There are numerous curves along the highway as it travels through DeKalb County. The highway maintains a generally eastward trajectory between Albertville and Collinsville. East of an intersection with U.S. Route 11 (US 11), the highway turns to the southeast, continuing on this orientation until it approaches Leesburg.

At Leesburg, SR 68 and US 411 intersect and begin a  concurrency as they cross Weiss Lake and Weiss Dam and approach Centre. SR 68 diverts from US 411 and begins a concurrency with SR 9 as the two highways again cross the lake, diverting from each other at Cedar Bluff. From there, SR 68 travels to the northeast as it approaches the Georgia state line.

Major intersections

See also

References

068
Transportation in Marshall County, Alabama
Transportation in DeKalb County, Alabama
Transportation in Cherokee County, Alabama